Nathan D. Snyder is an American actor, producer, and writer. He is known for his work on The Sigil, Item 47, and Player of the Game.

Life
Nathan D. Snyder was born in Denver, CO and grew up in Massachusetts. His family moved to California when Nathan was 11 years old. He studied theater in college in San Diego and then London. After attending college, Nathan moved to Los Angeles in 2009 and now works as a producer, writer and actor. He is the co-founder of Triple D Productions – a film, television, commercial and live event production company.

Filmography

Film

Television

External links 
 
 Nathan Dean Snyder on Variety

1984 births
Living people
American male film actors
American male television actors